The Tsentralnyi Rynok is a station on Kharkiv Metro's Kholodnohirsko–Zavodska Line. The station was opened on 23 August 1975. It is located in the central part of Kharkiv, near the №2 bus station and the Tsentralny Rynok, literally Central Market, for which the station is named.

In the beginning, a station named Kommynalnyi Rynok was planned to be built in the Blagoveschenskyi Raion. But during the examining pre-construction stage, the hydro-geological circumstances proved to be too poor for the construction of the station. As a result, the station was planned to be located some way to one side.

The station is lain shallow underground and is a single-vault design with a rounded ceiling. The station itself was designed by V.A. Spivachuk, and engineered by P.D Pashkov and Y.V. Lysenko. The partitions tracks have been held by grey marble, which has been introduced in traditional Ukrainian folk relief designs. The floor has been paved with multi-coloured polished granite, which is reminiscent of a carpet-like design.

Wide stairs which lead passengers to a station vestibule are located on both ends of the station, which gives the station an open feeling. The walls of the vestibule are decorated with light-grey and light-rose coloured marble.

The Tsentralny Rynok station is unique because it has a rounded ceiling which is held up with numerous rose marble columns. These columns were added in 1996 after serious deterioration of the ceiling caused by high levels of precipitation due to heavy rain fall in the summer of that year. However, during the column additions to the station, a task which lasted about a year, the station continued to be in full operation.

Tsentralny Rynok Station is located near Dim Trohivli (a four-story department store), Avto Vokzal 2 (a bus terminal) and the Kharkiv Yeshiva Ketana (a Jewish religious school for boys).

External links
 Tsentralny Rynok on Gortransport Kharkiv site

Kharkiv Metro stations
Railway stations opened in 1975